Lajovic is a Slovene surname and Lajović is a Serbian surname. Notable people with the surname include:

Anton Lajovic (1878–1960), Slovenian composer
Dušan Lajović (born 1990), Serbian tennis player
Misha Lajovic (1921–2008), Australian politician

Serbian surnames
Slovene-language surnames
Patronymic surnames